The athletics competition at the 2022 Pacific Mini Games was held between 21–25 June 2022 at the Oleai Sports Complex in Saipan, Northern Mariana Islands. Seven para-events were also staged at these games, (four for men and three for women).

Competition schedule

Participating nations
As of 1 June 2022, eighteen countries and territories have confirmed their participation in the athletics program for the games.

Medal table

Last updated: 24 June 2022 at 09:54:11pm (GMT+10).

Events summary

Men's

Women's

Para-events summary

Men's

Women's

References

Athletics at the Pacific Mini Games
Athletics in the Northern Mariana Islands
Pacific Games
2022 Pacific Mini Games